Martha Sprackland (born 1988) is a British writer.

Background 
Martha Sprackland is a writer, editor and translator from Spanish, born in Barnstaple in 1988, who grew up in Ainsdale, Merseyside. Her mother is the British poet Jean Sprackland. Her debut collection of poems, Citadel, was published in 2020 by Liverpool University Press, and shortlisted for the Forward Prize for Best First Collection, the Costa Poetry Prize, and the John Pollard Foundation International Poetry Prize. She has also published two pamphlets: Glass As Broken Glass (2017, Rack Press) and Milk Tooth (2018, Rough Trade Books).

Previously assistant poetry editor at Faber & Faber, Sprackland is the co-founder and editor of Offord Road Books, and was previously a co-founding editor of La Errante magazine and Cake magazine. From 2017 to 2021 she was an editor for Poetry London, of which she was acting poetry editor for five issues.

Bibliography 
Glass As Broken Glass (Rack Press, 2017)

Milk Tooth (Rough Trade Books, 2018)

Citadel (Liverpool University Press, 2020)

Awards 
1999: Simon Elvin Award (Foyle Young Poets of the Year Award) winner

2003: Foyle Young Poets of the Year Award runner-up

2005: Foyle Young Poets of the Year Award winner

2014: Eric Gregory Award recipient

2019: Michael Marks Pamphlet Award shortlist, Milk Tooth

2020: Forward Prize for Best First Collection shortlist, Citadel

2020: Costa Prize for Poetry shortlist, Citadel

2021: Peirene Stevns Translation Prize shortlist

2021: John Pollard International Poetry Prize shortlist, Citadel

External links 

 Martha Sprackland official page
 Citadel on Liverpool University Press
Offord Road Books website

References 

British poets
British women poets
British translators
People from Southport
1988 births
Living people